Presidential elections were held in Azerbaijan on 15 October 2003. As expected, Ilham Aliyev, son of the outgoing president, Heydar Aliyev, was officially elected with an overwhelming majority in an election which international observers held not to be free or fair.

Conduct
Human Rights Watch stated that the "election campaign... from the beginning was heavily manipulated by the government to favor Prime Minister Ilham Aliyev, son of President Heydar Aliyev. The government ensured that election commissions would be stacked to favor Aliyev, and banned nongovernmental organizations (NGOs) from monitoring the vote. As the election drew nearer, government officials openly sided with Ilham Aliyev, obstructed opposition rallies, and sought to limit participation in them.  Police have beaten and arbitrarily detained hundreds of opposition activists, including a 73-year-old woman."

The Institute for Democracy in Eastern Europe provided 188 election observers. The mission, requested by the United States government, formed part of a larger group of observers monitoring under the auspices of the OSCE. The IDEE observers observed more than 1,000 voting precincts and Constituency Election Centers where votes were tabulated, and collectively issued a "Votum Separatum," which expressed their outrage at election fraud, intimidation and political repression they witnessed during their observation mission and their disagreement with the OSCE's mild preliminary report calling the elections "generally well administered."

Results

References

External links
OSCE report

Presidential elections in Azerbaijan
Azerbaijan
Azerbaijan
2003 in Azerbaijan